Marusia, Marusja, or Marusya may refer to:

People
Marusia Churai (1625–1653), Ukrainian Baroque composer, poet, and singer
Marusia massacre 1925 Chilean government crackdown during a mining strike
Marusya Klimova (born 1961), Russian writer and translator
Letters from Marusia, 1976 Mexican film
Maria Nikiforova, widely known as Marusya (1885–1919), Ukrainian anarchist partisan leader
Marusya Ivanova Lyubcheva (born 1949), Bulgarian politician

Fiction
Marusia, a character in The Fiend
Marusja, a character in The Magic Mountain